The Hyundai Unicorns were a South Korean professional baseball team based in Suwon. They were a member of the KBO League. The Unicorns won the KBO championship four times (1998, 2000, 2003 and 2004).

The Unicorns were dissolved after the 2007 season. Hyundai Unicorns' players and staff were signed in a takeover deal and became the Heroes Baseball Club. The Unicorns and the Heroes have no historical links, although the new team consisted mostly of former Unicorns players.

History

Sammi Superstars 
The franchise was founded in 1982 as one of the original six teams in the Korea Baseball Organization. Owned by Sammi Steel Co., Ltd., the team was called the Sammi Superstars, and was based in Incheon.

The 1983 team featured one of the most remarkable pitching seasons in modern history. Japanese import Hiroaki Fukushi, dubbed "Jang Myeong-bu" in the KBO League, pitched in 60 of the team's 100 games, completing a record 36 of them, with five shutouts. He threw 427-1/3 innings, facing 1,712 batters, allowing 388 hits, walking 106, and striking out 220 (at that point a KBO League record), with a 2.34 ERA. He won a still-league record 30 games, lost 16, and saved an additional six games. He threw 192-2/3 more innings and allowed 155 more hits than the runner-up in those categories. Jang's 30 wins and 6 saves made up more than 69% of the team's 52 wins that year; for his efforts, he was given the 1983 KBO League Golden Glove Award in pitching.

Chungbo Pintos 
The 1985 Superstars team lost a league-record 18 games in a row between 31 March and 29 April. The team was sold to Chungbo on 29 June of that year, and between the two 1985 half-seasons, was renamed the  Chungbo Pintos.

Pacific Dolphins 
In 1988, the team was sold again, and renamed as Pacific Dolphins. In 1989 the franchise made the playoffs for the first time, eventually losing to the Haitai Tigers. 

The 1993 squad at one point lost 15 games in a row, finishing the season 34–82–10, with a winning percentage of .310. In 1994, the team finished second in the KBO, making it all the way to the franchise's first Korean Series, where they were defeated by the LG Twins four games to none.

Hyundai Unicorns 
After the  KBO season, due to financial difficulties, the team was sold again, this time to the Hynix Semiconductor branch of the Hyundai Group, and renamed the Hyundai Unicorns. Hyundai had previously sponsored the Hyundai Phoenix of the Korea Baseball Association amateur league, and due to the business relationship between the Phoenix and the newly named Unicorns, five players on the Phoenix roster moved to the Unicorns.

In 1996, the team hired Kim Jae-bak as manager, who would eventually guide them to four championships. The Unicorns made it to the Korean Series in their first year under Kim, but lost again, this time to the Tigers. 1998 was a banner year for the Unicorns, as they finished first in the KBO and finally won the Korean Series, against the LG Twins, four games to two.

The Unicorns' Chung Min-tae was one of the top pitchers in the KBO in the period from 1998 to 2003, as he won the KBO League Golden Glove Award three times during that span. Chung led the league in victories in three separate years — 1999, 2000, and 2003 — topping 20 victories in 1999.

In 2000, the team relocated from Incheon to Suwon. That year, the Unicorns finished first in the Dream League division, and again won the Korean Series, defeating Doosan Bears four games to three. In 2000, catcher Park Kyung-oan had arguably the best season of his career, hitting .282 with 40 home runs, and winning the KBO League Most Valuable Player Award.

The Unicorns finished in first place in 2003 and 2004, and won the Korean Series both times, defeating the SK Wyverns and Samsung Lions, respectively. Those teams were led offensively by Shim Jeong-soo and American import Cliff Brumbaugh. In 2003 Shim had a great season, hitting .335 with 53 home runs (second all-time) and 142 RBI, with a then-record OPS of 1.197 (still second all-time). In 2004 Brumbaugh came close to winning the KBO League Triple Crown with a .343 batting average (tops in the league), 33 home runs (second), and 105 RBI (third).

Despite the team's strong record during these years, from 2001 to 2007 the Unicorns faced financial challenges due to the majority owner, Hynix Semiconductor, being in court protection, as well as the team's low attendances. Through these years the Unicorns had to rely on financial assistance from other Hyundai affiliates. At the end of the 2006 season, the team was almost sold to Korea's National Agricultural Cooperative Federation, but the sale fell through. 

The team was dissolved in January 2008. After that, Seattle-based Centennial Investments signed Hyundai Unicorns' players and staff in a takeover deal, and founded the Heroes Baseball Club, moving the team to Seoul.

Season-by-season records

References

Hyundai Unicorns
KBO League teams
Baseball teams established in 1982
Baseball teams disestablished in 2008
Sport in Incheon
Sport in Suwon
Hyundai
1982 establishments in South Korea
2008 disestablishments in South Korea
History of baseball in South Korea